Prionapteryx lancerotella is a species of moth in the family Crambidae. It is found on the Canary Islands.

The wingspan is 17–20 mm.

References

Moths described in 1892
Ancylolomiini